The Ashchysu is a river in the Bukhar-Zhyrau District, Karaganda Region, and
May District, Pavlodar Region, Kazakhstan.

The area of the basin is a seasonal grazing ground for local cattle and the Ashchysu is used for watering livestock. The river is frozen between November and April.

Course 
The Ashchysu has its sources in the northwest-facing slopes of the Ayr Mountains of the Kazakh Uplands. It heads first northwards, then it bends when it reaches the highland plain and flows roughly northeastwards at the feet of the range along its northern slopes. Further downstream it describes a wide bend and heads roughly northwestwards, leaving the Kyzyltau to the east near Zhanatilek and Tuzkol. Finally it reaches lake Alkamergen (Алқамерген), entering it from the western shore.

The Ashchysu is fed mainly by snow, as well as underground water. Its main tributary is the Zhylandybulak. During the spring floods the water of the river is fresh, but in the summer the flow is interrupted and the river breaks up into pools of bitter/salty water.

See also
List of rivers of Kazakhstan

References 

Rivers of Kazakhstan
Karaganda Region
Pavlodar Region
Endorheic basins of Asia